Boekhout is a family name of Dutch origin, examples include:

 Geert Boekhout (born 1958), Belgian swimmer
 Henze Boekhout (born 1947), Dutch artist/photographer
 Louis Boekhout (1919–2012), painter born in the Netherlands who later immigrated to Québec Canada

See also
 Boekhoute, a community in Belgian province of East-Flanders
 Boechout, a community in Belgian province of Antwerp